Barbara Rose Kellerman (originally spelt Kellermann; born 30 December 1949) is an English actress, known for her film and television roles. She trained at Rose Bruford College.

Kellerman was born in Manchester, Lancashire. Her Jewish father, Walter Kellermann (1915–2012), had fled Nazi Germany and settled in Leeds, where he became a Senior Lecturer in the Department of Physics at the University of Leeds. Her mother, Marcelle, was a member of the French Resistance during the Second World War who became a teacher of modern foreign languages.

Kellerman has a younger brother Clive and a younger sister Judith.

Career
Kellerman's film credits include: Satan's Slave, The Monster Club and The Sea Wolves. Her television appearances include: Space: 1999, The Glittering Prizes, 1990, The Mad Death, Quatermass and The Chronicles of Narnia and the hard-hitting police drama The Professionals (1979), episode Runner, in which she played Sylvie the girlfriend of a former police officer who also has a relationship with a renegade former member of an organised crime network.

She is also known for her appearances in the BBC adaptations of three of the Narnia books, most notably as the tyrannical White Witch in The Lion, the Witch & the Wardrobe (1988). A year later she had a minor role as the Old Hag (Narnian Hag) in Prince Caspian in (1989), and finally as the evil Lady of the Green Kirtle in The Silver Chair in 1990. On the radio, she portrayed Modesty Blaise in a 1978 BBC World Service adaptation of the novel Last Day in Limbo.

She made a 20-minute drama for With Light Productions in 2007 for director Anita Parry entitled The Lights of Santa Cruz. It co-starred Christian Rodska and was the story of two middle-aged divorcees doing up a boat on the Somerset coast. It was filmed in Watchet, Somerset (a small shipping port on the south west coast of England) over a four-day period, mostly on a refitted Swedish fishing boat, the Josefine. The film was entered into Bristol's Brief Encounters Festival and is currently looking for distribution. During the late 1980s and early 1990s in between acting work, Kellerman worked for Sainsbury's in the former Green Park railway station in Bath.

Personal life 
Kellerman lived in Bath, Somerset during the 1980s and 1990s. She is a former wife of Robin Scobey (born 1945).

Filmography

Film

Television

References

External links
 

1949 births
Living people
English film actresses
English television actresses
Actresses from Manchester
Alumni of Rose Bruford College
English Jews
English people of German-Jewish descent
English people of French descent